Tokyo Express, Imperial Japanese Navy re-supply trips done by warships during World War II.

Tokyo Express may also refer to:

 Tokyo Express (flights), regular Soviet (and later Russian) military flights around Japan
 Tokio Express, a container ship scrapped in 2000

 Tokyu Corporation, a railway company "Tokyo Express Electric Railway Share Company".